Yu Yichuan (1917–1990) birth name An Jishan, was a People's Republic of China politician. He was born in Nanpi County, Hebei Province. He was governor of Yunnan Province.

1917 births
1990 deaths
People's Republic of China politicians from Hebei
Chinese Communist Party politicians from Hebei
Governors of Yunnan